Avanyu (also Awanyu), is a Tewa deity, the guardian of water. Represented as a horned or plumed serpent with curves suggestive of flowing water or the zig-zag of lightning, Awanyu appears on the walls of caves located high above canyon rivers in New Mexico and Arizona. Avanyu may be related to the feathered serpent of Mesoamerica–Quetzalcoatl and related deities. Avanyu is a frequent motif on Native American pottery of the Southwestern United States.

Awanyu is represented as a plumed, or horned serpent, who guards waterways and is a harbinger of storms; a protector of the Pueblo people.

The earliest representations of Avanyu are from 1000 AD. These were found on Mimbres pottery, a precursor to Pueblo pottery. In the Mogollon and Casa Grande districts images of Avanyu appear between 1200 and 1450 AD. Avanyu appears in Tewa and Tiwa speaking peoples areas around 1350 AD.

Archaeologist Dr. Polly Schaafsma, whose research specializes in Avanyu mythology among other subjects writes, “The horned serpent continues to be revered as an important deity among the Pueblos and is known by various names among the different linguistic groups, including Kolowisi (Zuni), Paaloloqangw (Hopi), and Awanyu (Tewa)." She goes on to write that Avanyu is also  "associated with the four (or six) directions, the colors of which the snakes also assume." Schaafsma notes that the water serpent's home is located in "springs, ponds, rivers, and ultimately the oceans, all believed to be connected under the earth’s surface, and … may cause torrential rains and floods.”

See also
 Horned Serpent
 Kukulkan
 The Great Serpent

References

Further reading
 American Irrigation Began With Awanyu the Serpent
 Horned serpent, feathered serpent

External links
 
 Avanyu: Protecting in the Rio Grande

Deities of the indigenous peoples of North America
Hopi mythology
Legendary serpents
Feathered serpent deities